Zanthoxylum piperitum, also known as Japanese pepper or Japanese prickly-ash is a deciduous aromatic spiny shrub or small tree of the citrus and rue family Rutaceae, native to Japan and Korea.

It is called sanshō in Japan and chopi in Korea. Both the leaves and fruits (peppercorns) are used as an aromatic and flavoring in these countries. It is closely related to the Chinese Sichuan peppers, which come from plants of the same genus.

Names 
"Japanese pepper" Z. piperitum is called  in Japan, but the corresponding cognate term in Korean, sancho refers to a different species, or Z. schinifolium known as inuzanshō or "dog sansho" in Japan. 

In Korea, Z. piperitum is called chopi, with the English common name given as "Korean pepper" by Korean sources. However, in several regional dialects, notably Gyeongsang dialect, it is also called sancho or jepi.

"Japanese prickly-ash" has been used as the standard American common name.

Varieties
The variety Z. piperitum var. inerme Makino, known in Japan as "Asakura zanshō" are thornless, or nearly so, and have been widely cultivated for commercial harvesting.

The forma Z. piperitum f. pubsescens (Nakai) W. T. Lee, is called teol chopi in Korea, and is assigned the English name "hairy chopi".

Range 
Its natural range spans from Hokkaido to Kyushu in Japan, southern parts of the Korean peninsula, and Chinese mainland.

Description 

The plant belongs to the citrus and rue family, Rutaceae.

The tree blooms in April to May, forming axillary flower clusters, about 5mm, and yellow-green in color. It is dioecious, and the flowers of the male plant can be consumed as hana-sanshō, while the female flowers yield berries or peppercorns of about 5mm. In autumn, these berries ripen, turning scarlet and burst, scattering the black seeds within.

The branch grows pairs of sharp thorns, and has odd-epinnately compound leaves, alternately arranged, with 5〜9 pairs of ovate leaflets having crenate (slightly serrated) margins.

It is a  host plant for the Japanese indigenous swallowtail butterfly species, the citrus butterfly Papilio xuthus, which has also spread to  Hawaii.

Chemical analysis has revealed that the seeds contain remarkably high concentrations of sugar-modified derivatives (glucosides) of N-methylserotonin and N,N-dimethylserotonin, also known as bufotenin.

Cultivation 
In Japan, Wakayama Prefecture boasts 80% of domestic production. Aridagawa, Wakayama produces a specialty variety called budō sanshō ("grape sansho"), which bears large fruits and clusters, rather like a bunch of grapes. The thornless variety, Asakura sansho, derives its name from its place of origin, the Asakura district in the now defunct , integrated into Yabu, Hyōgo.

Uses

Culinary 

The Japanese pepper is closely related to the Sichuan pepper of China, and they share the same genus.

Japanese cuisine 

The pulverized mature fruits ("peppercorns" or "berries") known as "Japanese pepper" or kona-zanshō are the standard spice for sprinkling on the kabayaki-unagi (broiled eel) dish. It is also one of the seven main ingredients of the blended spice called shichimi, which also contains red chili peppers. Finely ground Japanese pepper, kona-zanshō, is nowadays usually sold in sealed packets, and individual serving sizes are included inside heat-and-serve broiled eel packages.

Young leaves and shoots, pronounced ki-no-mé or ko-no-mé herald the spring season, and often garnish grilled fish and soups. They have a distinctive flavor which is not to the liking of everyone. It is a customary ritual to put a leaf between cupped hands, and clap the hands with a popping sound, this supposedly serving to bring out the aroma. The young leaves are crushed and blended with miso using suribachi (mortar) to make a paste, a pesto sauce of sorts, and then used to make various aemono (tossed salad). The stereotypical main ingredient for the resultant kinome-ae is the fresh harvest of bamboo shoots, but the sauce may be tossed (or delicately "folded") into sashimi, clams, squid or other vegetable such as tara-no-me (angelica-tree shoots).

The immature green berries are called ao-zanshō, and these may be blanched and salted, or simmered using soy sauce into dark-brown tsukudani, which is eaten as condiment. The berries are also available as shoyu-zuke, which is just steeped in soy sauce. The berries are also cooked with small fry fish and flavored with soy sauce, a specialty item of Kyoto, since its Mount Kurama outskirts is a renowned growing area of the plant.

There is also a dessert named , rice cake dessert flavored with ground Japanese pepper. It is a specialty in the north.

In central and northeastern Japan, there is also non-sticky rice-cake type confection called goheimochi, which is basted with miso-based paste and grilled, sometimes uses the Japanese pepper as flavor additive to the miso. Also being marketed are sansho flavored arare (rice crackers), snack foods, and sweet sansho-mochi.

Korean cuisine 

Both the plant itself and its fruit (or peppercorn), known as chopi, are called by many names including jepi, jenpi, jipi, and jopi in different dialects used in southern parts of Korea, where the plant is extensively cultivated and consumed.

Before the introduction of chili peppers from the New World which led to the creation of the chili paste gochujang, the Koreans used a jang paste spiced with chopi and black peppers.

In Southern Korean cuisine, dried and ground chopi fruit is used as a condiment served with varieties of food, such as chueo-tang (loach soup), maeun-tang (spicy fish stew), and hoe (raw fish).

Young leaves of the plant, called chopi-sun, are used as a culinary herb or a namul vegetable in Southern Korean cuisine. The leaves are also eaten pickled as jangajji, pan-fried to make buchimgae (pancake), or deep-fried as fritters such as twigak and bugak. Sometimes, chopi leaves are added to anchovy-salt mixture to make herbed fish sauce, called chopi-aekjeot.

Craftwork 

In Japan, the thick wood of the tree is traditionally made into a gnarled and rough-hewn wooden pestle (surikogi), to use with suribachi. While sansho wood surikogi are less common today, they impart subtle flavor to foods ground with them.

Folk medicine 

Japan
In Japanese pharmaceuticals, the mature husks with seeds removed are considered the crude medicine form of sanshō. The pungent taste derives from sanshool and sanshoamide. It also contains aromatic oils geraniol, dipentene, citral, etc.

Fishing 

In southern parts of Korea, the fruit is traditionally used in fishing. Being poisonous to small fish, a few fruit dropped in a pond make the fish float shortly after.

See also 

 Sichuan pepper
 Z. beecheyanum - iwa-zanshō, hire-zanshō; Okinawan dialect: sensuru-gii
 Z. schinifolium - inu-zanshō
 Z. armatum var. subtrifoliatum - fuyuzanshō

Explanatory notes

References 
Citation

Bibliography

 

Japanese condiments
Korean condiments
Korean vegetables
Medicinal plants of Asia
Namul
Spices
Trees of Japan
piperitum